KuGou is a Chinese music streaming and download service established in 2004 and owned by Tencent Music. It is the largest music streaming service in the world, with more than 450 million monthly active users. KuGou is the largest online music service in China, with a market share of 28 percent.

It has more than 800 million users. A merger between China Music Corporation and Tencent's QQ Music (QQ音乐) was announced on July 15, 2016. The services are expected to continue being offered separately. Together with Kuwo (酷我音乐), another online music service also owned by Tencent Music and the third largest one in China, KuGou holds a music award ceremony, the KU Music Asian Music Awards, also known as Cool Music Asia Festival Award. The service is only available in Mainland China.

References

External links 
  

Tencent
Tencent Music
Music streaming services
Online music stores of China